Greenock and Inverclyde is a constituency of the Scottish Parliament (Holyrood)  covering most of the council area of Inverclyde. It elects one Member of the Scottish Parliament (MSP) by the first past the post method of election. It is also one of ten constituencies in the West Scotland electoral region, which elects seven additional members, in addition to the ten constituency MSPs, to produce a form of proportional representation for the region as a whole.

The seat has been held by Stuart McMillan of the Scottish National Party since the 2016 Scottish Parliament election.

Electoral region 

The other nine constituencies of the West Scotland region are Clydebank and Milngavie, Cunninghame North, Cunninghame South, Dumbarton, Eastwood, Paisley, Renfrewshire North and West, Renfrewshire South and Strathkelvin and Bearsden.

The region covers part of the Argyll and Bute council area, the East Dunbartonshire council area, the East Renfrewshire council area, the Inverclyde council area, North Ayrshire council area, the Renfrewshire council area and the West Dunbartonshire council area.

Constituency boundaries and council area 

The constituency covers most of Inverclyde, including the main population centres of Greenock, Gourock and Port Glasgow. The eastern part of Inverclyde, around the village of Kilmacolm being covered by the Renfrewshire North and West constituency.

The Greenock and Inverclyde constituency was created at the same time as the Scottish Parliament, in 1999, with the name and boundaries of an  existing Westminster constituency. In 2005, however, the Westminster (House of Commons) constituency was merged into a new Inverclyde constituency.

The constituency boundaries were reviewed ahead of the 2011 Scottish Parliament election. The electoral wards used to form Greenock and Inverclyde are listed below:

In full: Inverclyde Central, Inverclyde East Central, Inverclyde North, Inverclyde South, Inverclyde South West, Inverclyde West
In part: Inverclyde East (shared with Renfrewshire North and West)

Member of the Scottish Parliament

Election results

2020s

2010s

2000s

1990s

Notes and references

External links

Constituencies of the Scottish Parliament
1999 establishments in Scotland
Constituencies established in 1999
Scottish Parliament constituencies and regions 1999–2011
Scottish Parliament constituencies and regions from 2011
Greenock
Politics of Inverclyde
Port Glasgow
Gourock